{{Infobox order
|name          = Supreme Order of the Most Holy Annunciation|image         = 
|caption       = The collar badge of the Order, which depicts Our Lady of the Annunciation, is worn on the feast day of the Most Holy Annunciation.
|awarded_by    = The Duke of Savoy as Sovereign Head 
|type          = Dynastic order of knighthood
|established   = c. 1362
|founder = Amadeus VI, Count of Savoy
|house         = House of Savoy
|motto         = F.E.R.T.(Fortitudo Eius Rhodum Tulit; By his bravery he conquered Rhodes)
|eligibility   = Military and civilian
|for           = 
Eminent service in high military positions
Distinguished civil service
Bringing distinction upon Italy
Rendering great service to the House of Savoy
|campaign      = 
|status        = Currently constituted
|head_title      = Grand Master
|head            = Prince Vittorio Emanuele, Prince of Naples or Prince Aimone of Savoy (disputed)
|head2_title     = Chairman of the Council
|head2           = Prince Emanuele Filiberto of Savoy, Prince of Venice (disputed)
|head3_title     = Grand Chancellor
|head3           = Johannes Theo Niederhauser (disputed)
|grades        = Knight 
|description   = 
|clasps        = 
|first_award   = 
|last_award    = 
|total         = 
|posthumous    = 
|recipients    = 
|individual    = 
|higher        = None (Highest)
|same          = 
|lower         = Royal Order of Saints Maurice and Lazarus
|related       = 
|image2        = 
|caption2      = Ribbon bar of the Supreme Order of the Most Holy Annunciation
}}

The Supreme Order of the Most Holy Annunciation is a Roman Catholic order of chivalry, originating in Savoy. It eventually was the pinnacle of the honours system in the Kingdom of Italy, which ceased to be a national order when the kingdom became a republic in 1946. Today, the order continues as a dynastic order under the jurisdiction of the Head of the House of Savoy.

History and statutes
The Supreme Order of the Most Holy Annunciation originated in 1362, when Amadeus VI, Count of Savoy (1343-1383) instituted the order's earliest designation, under the title of Order of the Collar. The order was dedicated to the Blessed Virgin Mary, who is celebrated as "Our Lady of the Annunciation." The order is a dynastic religious (or Catholic) order of chivalry.

Under its first formulation, the order had fifteen knights. The number was symbolic of the number of daily masses celebrated with the order. In 1409, Amadeus VIII, Duke of Savoy, gave the order its first known statutes, and in 1434, he extended the order to five more knights.

Amadeus VIII's statutes were subsequently amended and reformed by Charles III, Duke of Savoy in 1518, by Emanuele Filiberto, Duke of Savoy in 1570, and thereafter by succeeding Sovereigns. The most recent took place on 11 June 1985 by HRH Victor Emmanuel, Prince of Naples and hereditary Grand Master of the order. It was in 1518, that many of the present designations were instituted. Most importantly, the order's name was changed to its current name, The Most Holy Order of the Annunciation. The badge of the order was also changed, with the representation of the Blessed Virgin Mary being added.

The order, throughout its early history and following the reforms of Charles III, was awarded for supreme recognition of distinguished services. The order constituted a kind of religious and military fraternity between the Sovereign Head of the Order and his companions; it was reserved exclusively to distinguished men-at-arms who, apart from exemplary service, had to be of illustrious birth, particularly of catholic and noble birth.

Eventually, it was deemed appropriate to recognize those who had rendered distinguished service to the Kingdom of Italy (and the House of Savoy) in the exercise of high civil offices, not requiring, when such achievements could be demonstrated, nobility of birth as well.

The order holds the following other regulations:
The number of knights of the Supreme Order of the most Holy Annunciation shall be, as in the past, twenty.
The right to appoint knights and officers of the Order appertains exclusively to the Sovereign Head. When there are vacancies, the Sovereign Head meets with the Chapter of knights to hear their advice on the proposal of candidates whom he alone may select.
The knights shall be chosen from distinguished individuals in recognition of their eminent services in high military positions, as well as from those who have distinguished themselves in senior positions in the civil service, and from those who, as private citizens have brought distinction upon Italy as exemplary benefactors of the Nation or of Mankind, or have rendered particularly noteworthy services to the Royal House of Savoy.
Knights must have already been awarded the Order of Saints Maurice and Lazarus.
Knights must be Catholic. In rare occasions, a non-Catholic may be awarded the order. However, they may only be honorary members of the order.

In 1925, a law was passed on the day before Christmas which made the Head of Government (who at the time was Benito Mussolini) the Secretary of the Order, and stipulated that he would preside over the Knights of the Order at public functions and ceremonies.

Classes and insignia

The order has one class, i.e. Knight. The full Italian title is Cavaliere dell'Ordine Supremo della Santissima Annunziata.

The order has two sets of insignia, the Piccola Collana and the Grande Collana. The two hold similar designs, though the Grande Collana has some different features than the Piccola Collana and is worn only on the most special of occasions.

The primary and oldest insignia of the order is its collar. It consists of a solid gold medallion of the collar, which portrays the Annunciation of the Blessed Virgin Mary by the Archangel Gabriel. The medallion is surrounded by three intertwined Savoyan knots, decorated with small crosses fleury, and in the upper center, between two of the Savoyan knots, a cluster of rays with a dove, representing the Holy Spirit, is depicted also in gold.

The badge is suspended from a gold chain made up of fifteen ornate gold sections, each of which is linked by Savoyan knot. Each has the letters F.E.R.T. interwoven. The meaning of these letters have been of some controversy, to which a number of interpretations have been offered. The first states that the letters stand for Fortitudo Eius Rhodum Tulit (meaning "By his bravery he conquered Rhodes"), referring to the victory at Rhodes by Count Amadeus V in 1310.

Some have also suggested that the letters are actually the third person singular of the present indicative tense of the Latin verb ferre, which would indicate that the order is supported by the bond of faith sworn to the Virgin Mary.  It has been noted that the letters FERT were found on the tombs of members of the House of Savoy long before 1310 and suggest that they represent a local medieval variant of the Latin third person singular past tense meaning "he bore" (i.e., "Christ bore our sins/sufferings").  The letters may also stand for Foedere et Religione Tenemur (meaning "We are held by Pact and Religion"), a motto associated with Victor Amadeus I (1718-1730). It may also stand for Fortitudo Eius Republicam Tenet (meaning "His strength defends the State").

The star of the order, which was first used in 1680 by specifications of the Royal Lady Maria Giovana Battista, Duchess Regent of Savoy, is of gold and also has a representation of the Annunciation in a medallion in the center which is set within a gold cross of four pommels. This is surrounded by a cluster of gold rays. Between the arms of the cross of four pommels are the letters F.E.R.T.

The Grande Collana differs from the Piccola Collana in that the collar consists of fourteen ornate sections, each of which is made up of the letters F.E.R.T. in gold, intertwined with a white and red enameled Savoyan knot. The sections are interlinked with fourteen roses, alternately enameled red and white. The roses represent the mysteries in the life of the Blessed Virgin Mary. The knots surrounding the medallion of the collar is enameled white, red, and blue.

The insignia of the order has the following regulations:
 The large collar (Grande Collana) is worn on the first day of the year, on the feast of the Most Holy Annunciation, and on all of the principal national holidays and at important royal functions.
The small collar (Piccola Collana) is worn on every other occasion which necessitates the display of order insignia.
Knights also wear, on the left breast, a star badge bearing the image of Holy Mary of the Annunciation.

On initiation of a new knight into the order, the small collar was worn by the initiate before the accolade by Grand Master. After the accolade the Grand Master would place the large collar over the shoulders of the new knight.

When the order is not worn, Knights may wear a gold miniature of the badge (medallion of the collar) of the order suspended from a red ribbon. They may also wear either a ribbon-bar (upon a uniform) or a rosette (upon a suit), both of which are red and have a miniature cross of four pommels engraved with the Annunciation.

Grand Magisterium

While the Grand Magisterium of Prince Aimone of Savoy is limited to his claim, the Grand Magisterium of Victor Emmanuel, Prince of Naples is currently in effect. The governing body of the dynastic orders of the Royal House of Savoy consists of the Sovereign and Grand Master of the Order, the Grand Chancellor of the Order, the Council of the Order, Members, and the Giunta of the Order. The following are some of those that make up the Grand Magisterium of the order.

Grand Master: Victor Emmanuel, Prince of Naples (Head of the Royal House of Savoy, disputed by Prince Aimone of Savoy)
Chairman/President of the Council: Emanuele Filiberto of Savoy, Prince of Venice (heir to the Head of the Royal House of Savoy, disputed by Prince Aimone of Savoy's son Prince Umberto)
Cardinal protector: Giovanni Cardinal Cheli 
Grand Chancellor: Johannes Theo Niederhauser
Grand Treasurer: Nicolas Gagnebin
Grand Prior: Mgr. Paolo de Nicolò (titular Bishop of Mariana) 
Grand Master of Ceremonies: Alberto Bochicchio

Notable recipients
George V
Philipp, Landgrave of Hesse
Hermann Göring
Simeon Saxe-Coburg-Gotha, former king of Bulgaria
Felipe VI, current king of Spain
Matthew Festing, former Grand Master of the Sovereign Military Order of Malta
Benito Mussolini, Prime Minister of Italy and Duce of Fascism
Vittorio Emanuele, Prince of Naples
Prince Aimone of Savoy
Emanuele Filiberto of Savoy, Prince of Venice
Mariano Hugo, Prince of Windisch-Graetz 

Among the notable recipients of the order of the Annunciation, King Amanullah of Afghanistan (reigned 1919–1929) should probably be mentioned, especially since he was not a Christian. He received the honor during his State visit to Italy in 1928, when he authorized, for the first time, the opening of a Catholic church in Afghanistan (within the Italian Embassy) and the residence of a Catholic priest.

 See also 
List of Italian orders of knighthood
Dynastic order
Order of Merit of the Italian Republic

 Notes 

External links

Ordine supremo della Santissima Annunziata - official website of the dynastic orders of the Royal House of Savoy (Italian)''
Order of the Most Holy Annunciation (Chivalric Orders site)

References
 

Most Holy Annunciation, Order of the
Most Holy Annunciation, Order of the
Most Holy Annunciation, Order of the
1360s establishments in the Holy Roman Empire
14th-century establishments in Italy
Most Holy Annunciation, Order of the
Holy Annunciation, Order of the Most
Catholic orders of chivalry